Lincoln Cass Films was a short-lived Australian film production company.

History
Formed in July 1913, its principal filmmakers were W. J. Lincoln and Godfrey Cass and the managing director of the company was H. Dean Stewart. Charles Wheeler was stage manager and Maurice Bertel was the cinematographer. The company hired actors from Melbourne theatre along with "Australian bush riders". It also occasionally gave live performances.

Movies were made at a glass-roofed studio in Cole Street in the Melbourne suburb of Elsternwick. Locations were shot in bushland near the town of Healesville. Between July and October 1913 they made eight features, of which only The Sick Stockrider survives today.

According to one report:
The idea of the management is to produce the best pictures possible and though the market at this end of the globe is limited, and they are, in consequence, more severely handicapped than American and European producers, they anticipate that the world's markets will accept their work if it is up to the accepted standard of design and treatment. They are convinced that Australia possesses natural beauties equal to those of any part of the globe, some of them very little known even to Australians themselves, and their intention is to procure a class of pictures of sensational interest, coupled with artistic feature, but not to over burden the public with too much of bushranging incidents, for the bush ranger is, after all, only a type, and a limited type, of the figures which moved across the Australian stage of history in its early development.

The Sick Stockrider was the first movie released.

The company had trouble getting its films seen throughout Australia. Dean Stewart attributed this directly to the influence of Australasian Films and their practice of enforcing block booking. For example, Lincoln Cass did not get a film seen in Sydney until The Road to Ruin (1913), and even then that was only after they set up an exchange in Sydney. Their Melbourne offices were gutted by fire in 1914. The company folded, and their studio was sold to J. C. Williamson Ltd in 1915.

Filmography
The Sick Stockrider (1913)
Moondyne (1913)
The Remittance Man (1913)
Transported (1913)
The Road to Ruin (1913)
The Crisis (1913)
The Reprieve (1913)
The Wreck (1913)

See also

List of companies of Australia
List of film production companies
List of television production companies

References

External links
Lincoln-Cass Films at National Film and Sound Archive

Film production companies of Australia